One More River to Cross is the tenth studio album by Canned Heat, released in 1973. The band negotiated out of their contract with Liberty Records and debuted with Atlantic Records. This album featured horn arrangements played by the Muscle Shoal Horns along with Barry Beckett and Roger Hawkins. The album cover was designed by Ernie Cefalu.

Track listing
"One More River to Cross" (Daniel Moore) – 3:10
"L.A. Town" (Canned Heat) – 3:28
"I Need Someone" (Bob Hite) – 4:54
"Bagful of Boogie" (Canned Heat) – 3:34
"I'm a Hog for You Baby" (Jerry Leiber, Mike Stoller) – 2:40
"You Am What You Am" (James Shane) – 4:31
"Shake, Rattle and Roll" (Charles E. Calhoun, Joel Scott Hill) – 2:31
"Bright Times Are Comin'" (Canned Heat) – 3:11
"Highway 401" (Canned Heat) – 3:53
"We Remember Fats" (Fats Domino Medley) (Dave Bartholomew, Fats Domino, Al Lewis) – 5:07

Personnel
Canned Heat
Bob Hite – vocals, harmonica
Henry Vestine – lead guitar
James Shane – rhythm guitar, bass, vocals
Ed Beyer - keyboards
Richard Hite – bass, rhythm guitar, vocals
Adolfo de la Parra – drums

Additional personnel
Muscle Shoal Horns – horns
Roger Hawkins – drums
Barry Beckett – keyboards

Production
Barry Beckett – producer
Roger Hawkins – producer
Jerry Masters – engineer
Steve Melton – engineer

References

1973 albums
Canned Heat albums
Albums produced by Barry Beckett
Atlantic Records albums
Albums recorded at Muscle Shoals Sound Studio
Albums with cover art by Drew Struzan